The 1936 United States presidential election in Idaho took place on November 3, 1936, as part of the 1936 United States presidential election. State voters chose four representatives, or electors, to the Electoral College, who voted for president and vice president.

Idaho was won by incumbent President Franklin D. Roosevelt (D–New York) and Vice President John Nance Garner (D–Texas) with 62.96 percent of the popular vote, over Governor Alf Landon (R–Kansas) and running mate Frank Knox (R–Illinois) with 33.19 percent of the popular vote.

Idaho has since become a Republican stronghold; as of 2020, this election marks the last time that Ada County, Canyon County, Gooding County, Jerome County, Lincoln County, Payette County and Twin Falls County would vote for a Democratic presidential nominee, the last time that a Democrat would carry the state by double digits, and the last time that the state would (by margin of victory) vote more Democratic than the nation as a whole.

Results

Results by county

See also
 United States presidential elections in Idaho

References

Idaho
1936
1936 Idaho elections